Cleveland is a village in Henry County, Illinois, United States. The population was 188 at the 2010 census, down from 253 in 2000.

Geography
Cleveland is located at  (41.507084, -90.313624).

The village sits along the Rock River.

Demographics

At the 2000 census there were 253 people, 94 households, and 70 families living in the village. The racial makeup of the village was 98.81% White, and 1.19% from two or more races. Hispanic or Latino of any race were 4.35%.

Of the 94 households 30.9% had children under the age of 18 living with them, 63.8% were married couples living together, 7.4% had a female householder with no husband present, and 24.5% were non-families. 20.2% of households were one person and 8.5% were one person aged 65 or older.  The average household size was 2.69 and the average family size was 3.15.

The age distribution was 24.5% under the age of 18, 9.9% from 18 to 24, 28.5% from 25 to 44, 28.1% from 45 to 64, and 9.1% 65 or older.  The median age was 38 years. For every 100 females, there were 91.7 males.  For every 100 females age 18 and over, there were 91.0 males.

The median household income was $46,339 and the median family income  was $47,396. Males had a median income of $41,875 versus $20,833 for females. The per capita income for the village was $19,990.  About 4.2% of families and 6.4% of the population were below the poverty line, including 8.5% of those under the age of eighteen and 10.3% of those sixty five or over.

References

Villages in Henry County, Illinois
Villages in Illinois